Khoshk Darreh, also known as Khoshkeh Darreh, may refer to:
 Khoshk Darreh, Afghanistan
 Khoshk Darreh, Chalus, Iran